Sulovo is a rural locality (a village) in Posyolok Urshelsky, Gus-Khrustalny District, Vladimir Oblast, Russia. The population was 7 as of 2010.

Geography 
Sulovo is located 13 km west of Gus-Khrustalny (the district's administrative centre) by road. Gusevsky-4 is the nearest rural locality.

References 

Rural localities in Gus-Khrustalny District